Tylopilus sanctae-rosae is a bolete fungus in the family Boletaceae. Found in Costa Rica, where it grows under the oak species Quercus oleoides, it was described as new to science in 1983 by mycologist Rolf Singer.

References

External links

sanctae-rosae
Fungi described in 1983
Fungi of Central America
Taxa named by Rolf Singer